De Onderneming is a smock mill in Witmarsum, Friesland, Netherlands which was built in 1850 and is in working order. It is used as a training mill. The mill is listed as a Rijksmonument.

History
De Onderneming was built in 1850, probably by millwright Van der Meer of Harlingen, Friesland. The foundation stone was laid on 17 September. In 1896, the mill was bought by Geurt Stoffels. It passed to his son Heimen in 1956. Following Heimen's death in 1968, the mill fell into disrepair. It was bought by the Gemeente Wûnseradiel. Restoration took place in 1970-71. Further restorations took place in 1988 and 1994. The mill is in the ownership of the Stichting tot Behoud van Momumenten in de gemeente Súdwest Fryslân. Used as a training mill, it is listed as a Rijksmonument, № 39437.

Description

De Onderneming is what the Dutch describe as a "Stellingmolen". It is a smock mill on a wooden base. The smock and cap are thatched. The mill is winded by tailpole and winch. The sails are Common sails, fitted with the  Fok system on their leading edges. The sails are carried on a cast-iron windshaft, which was cast  by Fabrikaat De Muinck Keizer of Martenshoek, Groningen in 1891. The windshaft also carries the brake wheel which has 60 cogs. This drives the wallower (31 cogs) at  the top of the upright shaft. At the bottom of the upright shaft is the great spur wheel, which has 75 cogs. The great spur wheel drives a pair of  diameter Cullen millstones via a lantern pinion stone nut which has 22 staves. A pair of  Cullen millstones is driven via a lantern pinion stone nut which has 19 staves.

Millers
 Geurt Stoffels (1896-1956)
 Heimen Stoffels (1956–64)

Public access
De Onderneming is open to the public on Saturday between 09:00 and 12:00, or by appointment.

References

Windmills in Friesland
Windmills completed in 1850
Smock mills in the Netherlands
Grinding mills in the Netherlands
Agricultural buildings in the Netherlands
Rijksmonuments in Friesland
Octagonal buildings in the Netherlands